Iosif Ovidiu Tâlvan (born 29 July 1972, in Sibiu) is a retired Romanian football midfielder.

Career
A left back, Tâlvan made 268 Liga I appearances for FC Inter Sibiu, FC Dinamo București, AFC Rocar București and SC Astra Ploieşti. He also won Liga I twice and the Cupa României three times with Dinamo.

Honours
Dinamo București
Liga I: 1999–00, 2001–02
Cupa României: 1999–00, 2000–01, 2002–03
Universitatea Cluj
Liga II: 2006–07

References

External links

1972 births
Living people
Sportspeople from Sibiu
Romanian footballers
Romanian expatriate footballers
Romania international footballers
Henan Songshan Longmen F.C. players
Pegah Gilan players
FC Inter Sibiu players
FC Dinamo București players
FC Astra Giurgiu players
CSM Unirea Alba Iulia players
Romanian expatriate sportspeople in China
Expatriate footballers in China
Expatriate footballers in Iran
Association football midfielders